Sylvan Grove is an unincorporated community in Clark County, Indiana, in the United States.

History
A post office was established at Sylvan Grove in 1849, and remained in operation until it was discontinued in 1862.

References

Unincorporated communities in Clark County, Indiana
Unincorporated communities in Indiana